Calopteryx syriaca is a species of damselfly in the family Calopterygidae known commonly as the Syrian demoiselle. It is native to the southern Levant, where it is known from Israel, Jordan, Lebanon, Palestine, and Syria. This is sometimes considered to be a subspecies of the banded demoiselle (C. splendens).

This damselfly inhabits habitat along rivers such as the Orontes, Litani, and Jordan. Its populations have declined due to loss of habitat in the river systems in the area.

References 

Calopterygidae
Odonata of Asia
Insects of the Middle East
Insects described in 1842
Taxonomy articles created by Polbot